The  was the 1943-44 War Programme to fund the armaments expansion plan of the Imperial Japanese Navy (IJN).

Background
Early 1944, the IJN started building warships for war. The plan did not include any large warships which were suitable for offensive operations.

Table of vessels funded under 1944-45 Estimates

Table of vessels funded under 1945-46 Estimates
This programme was projected only, and the vessels were never ordered.

References
Rekishi Gunzō series, Gakken (Japan)
The Maru Special series, Ushio Shobō
Daiji Katagiri, Ship Name Chronicles of the Imperial Japanese Navy Combined Fleet, Kōjinsha (Japan), June 1988, 
 (SNAJ), Histories of shipbuilding in Shōwa period (1),  (Japan), September 1977
大日本帝国海軍艦艇一覧 (ja)

See also
1st Naval Armaments Supplement Programme (Maru 1 Keikaku, 1931)
2nd Naval Armaments Supplement Programme (Maru 2 Keikaku, 1934)
3rd Naval Armaments Supplement Programme (Maru 3 Keikaku, 1937)
4th Naval Armaments Supplement Programme (Maru 4 Keikaku, 1939)
Temporal Naval Armaments Supplement Programme (Maru Rin Keikaku, 1940)
Rapidly Naval Armaments Supplement Programme (Maru Kyū Keikaku, 1941)
Additional Naval Armaments Supplement Programme (Maru Tui Keikaku, 1941)
5th Naval Armaments Supplement Programme (Maru 5 Keikaku, 1941)
6th Naval Armaments Supplement Programme (Maru 6 Keikaku, 1942)
Modified 5th Naval Armaments Supplement Programme (Kai-Maru 5 Keikaku, 1942)

Naval Armaments Supplement Programme
Naval Armaments Supplement Programme